Miss Nicaragua 2019 was held on August 17, 2019, at the Holiday Inn Managua - Convention Center in Managua. At the conclusion of the final night of competition, Ingger Zepeda of Managua, first runner-up of Miss Nicaragua 2018, crowned Inés López of Managua as her successor at the end of the event. López represented Nicaragua at Miss Universe 2019.

Placements

Special Awards

Official Contestants
10 contestants competed for the title of Miss Nicaragua 2019.

References

Miss Nicaragua
2019 in Nicaragua
2019 beauty pageants